The Panzerjäger I ("English: tank hunter number 1") was the first German tank destroyer to see service in the Second World War. All mounted the Czech Škoda-built 4.7 cm KPÚV vz. 38 (German designation "4.7 cm Pak (t)") antitank gun on a converted Panzer I Ausf. B chassis. It was intended to counter heavy French tanks like the Char B1 bis that were beyond the capabilities of the 3.7 cm Pak 36 anti-tank gun and extended the life of the obsolete Panzer I chassis. A total of 202 Panzer I chassis were converted to Panzerjäger I standard in 1940–41, and were employed in the Battle of France, in the North Africa Campaign and on the Eastern Front.

Design and production
The Panzer I turret was removed and a fixed gun shield added to protect the armament and crew. The antitank gun was mounted on a pedestal in the fighting compartment after wheels, axle and trails were removed, but retained its original gun shield. It normally carried 74 antitank and 10 HE shells. Alkett and contractors built 202 vehicles, the first series of 132 by Alkett in 1940. Ten of the second series of 70 were assembled by Alkett while the remainder were assembled by Klöckner-Humboldt-Deutz in 1940 and 1941. The first series had a five sided shield.; vehicles in the second series are recognizable by their seven sided gun shield.  

The formal name was 4.7 cm PaK(t) (Sf) auf Panzerkampfwagen I ohne Turm, translating as "4.7 cm antitank gun (Czech) (self-propelled) on turretless Pz.Kpfw. I".

Organization
Panzerjägers were organized into companies of 9, with 3 companies per battalion, although for the French Campaign,  anti-tank battalion Panzerjäger-Abteilung 521 had just 6 vehicles per company.  For the remainder of the war, they were used solely by independent antitank battalions, with two exceptions post the Balkan Campaign, one company was assigned to the SS-Brigade Leibstandarte der SS Adolf Hitler and another to PanzerjägerAbteilung 900 of Lehr-Brigade (mot.) 900 ("900th Motorized Training Brigade") in preparation for Operation Barbarossa.

Combat history
Antitank Battalions 521, 616, 643 and 670 had 99 vehicles in the Battle of France. Only Antitank Battalion 521 participated in the campaign from the beginning; the other three were still training until a few days after the campaign began but were sent to the front as training finished.

Twenty-seven Panzerjäger I equipped Antitank Battalion 605 in North Africa. It arrived in Tripoli, Libya between 18 and 21 March 1941. Five replacements were sent in September 1941 but only three arrived on 2 October, the others being sunk on board the freighter Castellon. At the start of the British Operation Crusader the battalion was at full strength but lost thirteen vehicles during the battles. Four more replacements were sent in January 1942 so that it mustered seventeen at the beginning of the Battle of Gazala. Despite the shipment of another three vehicles from September–October 1942, the battalion only had eleven by the beginning of the Second Battle of El Alamein. The last two replacements  were received by the battalion in November 1942.

Anti-tank battalions 521, 529, 616, 643 and 670 were equipped with 135 Panzerjäger I for Operation Barbarossa. They were assigned as given below for the opening stages of the battle:

By 27 July 1941, Abteilung 529 had lost four Panzerjäger I vehicles. On 23 November 1941 it reported that it still had 16 vehicles, although two were not operational. On 5 May 1942, Battalion 521 reported that only five of those vehicles still existed. Abteilung 529 had only two on strength when it was disbanded on 30 June 1942. Abteilung 616 seems to have been an exception as it reported all three companies were equipped with the Panzerjäger I, during mid or late 1942.

Combat assessments

 643, 25 July 1940
In effect the crew behind the gun shield were blind in urban combat, suppressing fire and individual tanks".
 521, July 1941
When attacking an enemy position equipped with anti-tank guns and artillery, namely near Mogilev and Rogachev, its rather tall superstructure presented a target for artillery and anti-tank guns. When large shells explode close-by, shrapnel pierced the thin armor. Russian  anti-tank guns already penetrate at  range. The 1st Kompanie lost 5 out of the 10 vehicles (Kampffahrzeuge) in such actions, of which only two could be repaired."
 605, July 1942
However, its penetration qualities were far too low for the necessary combat ranges in the desert of North Africa. The chassis, engine and suspension were constantly in need of care due to the additional weight of the anti-tank gun. It usually penetrates  of armor. Therefore, a small percentage of these rounds are desired. But the crew will abandon the tank because fragments spall off the armor on the inside."

See also

Comparable vehicles
 – similar German vehicle mounting a 47 mm gun on a Renault R35 chassis
Semovente da 47/32 – comparable Italian vehicle using a 47 mm gun
TACAM R-1 – Romanian project comparable in characteristics

Notes

References
 Chamberlain, Peter, and Hilary L. Doyle. Thomas L. Jentz (Technical Editor). Encyclopedia of German Tanks of World War Two: A Complete Illustrated Directory of German Battle Tanks, Armoured Cars, Self-propelled Guns, and Semi-tracked Vehicles, 1933–1945. London: Arms and Armour Press, 1978 (revised edition 1993).

External links
 Surviving Panzer I tanks - A PDF file presenting the Panzer I tanks (PzKpfw. I, VK1801, Panzerbefehlswagen, Panzerjäger I tanks) still existing in the world

World War II tank destroyers of Germany
Military vehicles introduced from 1940 to 1944